The following is a list of Canadian film, television and theatre directors, in alphabetical order.

A 

 Jennifer Abbott (documentary)
 Louise Abbott (documentary film)
 Sarah Abbott (film)
 Mark Achbar (film)
 Patrick J. Adams (television)
 David Acomba
 Alfons Adetuyi (film, television)
 Robert Adetuyi (film)
 Philip Akin (theatre)
 Atuat Akkitirq (film)
 Zaynê Akyol (documentary)
 Geneviève Albert (film)
 Clint Alberta (documentary film)
 Martha Allan (theatre)
 Jennifer Alleyn (film)
 Paul Almond
 Bonnie Ammaq (film)
 Janet Amos (theatre)
 John Murray Anderson (theatre)
 Robert Anderson (documentary)
 Irene Angelico (documentary)
 Catherine Annau (documentary)
 Denys Arcand (film)
 Louise Archambault (film)
 Sylvain Archambault (film, television)
 Kay Armatage (documentary)
 Aviva Armour-Ostroff (film, theatre)
 Alethea Arnaquq-Baril (documentary)
 Asinnajaq (film)
 Olivier Asselin (film)
 Robin Aubert (film)
 Albéric Aurtenèche (film)
 Roger Avary (film)
 Susan Avingaq (film)

B 
 Marina Rice Bader (film)
 Jennifer Baichwal (documentary)
 Norma Bailey (film, TV)
 Paule Baillargeon (film)
 David Baird (theatre)
 David Bairstow (documentary)
 Liza Balkan (theatre)
 Ara Ball (film)
 Sofia Banzhaf (film)
 Manon Barbeau (documentary)
 Paul Barbeau (film)
 Anaïs Barbeau-Lavalette (film)
 Sarah Baril Gaudet (documentary)
 Keith Barker (theatre)
 Renny Bartlett (film)
 Jephté Bastien (film)
 Jérémie Battaglia (documentary)
 Michael Bawtree (theatre)
 Jean Beaudry (film)
 Renée Beaulieu (film)
 Guy Beaulne (theatre)
 Keith Behrman (film, TV)
 Shane Belcourt (film)
 Attila Bertalan (film)
 Angela Besharah (theatre)
 Raoul Bhaneja (television)
 Julian Biggs (documentary)
 Vincent Biron (film)
 Roshell Bissett (film)
 Matt Bissonnette (film)
 Roger Blais (documentary)
 Jack Blum (theatre)
 Sofia Bohdanowicz (film)
 Nicolas Bolduc (film)
 Osmond Borradaile (documentary)
 Clay Borris (film, television)
 Miryam Bouchard (film, television)
 Luc Bourdon (documentary)
 Antoine Bourges (film)
 François Bouvier (film, television)
 Maureen Bradley (film)
 André Brassard (theatre, film)
 Jennifer Brewin (theatre)
 Manon Briand (film)
 Donald Brittain (documentary)
 Sandrine Brodeur-Desrosiers (film)
 Rex Bromfield (film, television)
 Daniel Brooks (theatre)
 Amnon Buchbinder (film)
 Alex Bulmer (theatre)
 Paul Buissonneau (theatre)
 Gary Burns (film)
 Andrea Bussmann (film)
 Jason Buxton (film)

C 
 Terril Calder (animated film)
 Jorge Camarotti (film)
 James Cameron (film)
 Peg Campbell (film)
 Sterling Campbell (film)
 Tamo Campos (documentary)
 Dominique Cardona (film, television)
 Mélanie Carrier (documentary)
 Bruno Carrière (film, television)
 Peter Carter (film, television)
 Kirsten Carthew (film)
 Kate Cayley (theatre)
 Catherine Chabot (film)
 Shirley Cheechoo (film)
 Aisling Chin-Yee (film)
 Mary-Colin Chisholm (theatre)
 Monia Chokri (film)
 Lloyd Lee Choi (film)
 Cam Christiansen (animation)
 Al Christie
 Charles Christie
 Glen Chua
 Milan Chvostek
 Jerry Ciccoritti (film, stage, television)
 Sean Cisterna (film)
 Andrew Cividino (film)
 Millefiore Clarkes (film, music video)
 Mike Clattenburg (television)
 Jim Cliffe (film, television)
 Daniel Cockburn (film)
 Joy Coghill (theatre)
 Sidney M. Cohen (television)
 Laurie Colbert (film)
 Randall Cole (film)
 Layne Coleman (film, theatre)
 Phil Comeau (film, television)
 Jérémy Comte (film)
 Guy L. Coté (documentary)
 Marie-Hélène Cousineau (film)
 Jeanne Crépeau (film)
 Suzanne Crocker (documentary)
 Brandon Cronenberg (film)
 David Cronenberg (film)
 Seán Cummings (theatre)

D 
 Jamie M. Dagg (film)
 Zale Dalen (film, television)
 Tom Daly (documentary)
 Marie-Julie Dallaire (film)
 Francis Damberger (film, television)
 James Buddy Day (film, television, documentary)
 Deco Dawson (film)
 Luis De Filippis (film)
 Guillaume de Fontenay (film)
 Miranda de Pencier (film)
 Tracey Deer (television, film, documentary)
 Michael Del Monte (documentary)
 Joshua Demers (film)
 Mathieu Denis (film)
 Paul-Émile d'Entremont (documentary)
 Sophie Deraspe (film)
 Bernard Devlin (documentary) 
 Seán Devlin (film)
 Xavier Dolan (film)
 Andrea Donaldson (theatre)
 Nicole Dorsey (film)
 Alexandre Dostie (film)
 Mike Downie (documentary)
 Michael Downing (film)
 Michael Dowse (film)
 Rosvita Dransfeld (documentary)
 Igor Drljaca (film)
 Alexa-Jeanne Dubé (film, music video)
 Félix Dufour-Laperrière (documentary, animation)
 Christian Duguay
 Geneviève Dulude-De Celles (film)
 Danny Dunlop (film)
 Katrina Dunn (theatre)
 Stephen Dunn (film)
 George Dunning (animation, documentary, film)
 Sophie Dupuis (film)
 Alexis Durand-Brault (film)
 Jean-Philippe Duval (television, film, documentary)
 Audrey Dwyer (theatre)
 Gaëlle d'Ynglemare (film)

E 
 Chris Earle (theatre)
 Gwaai Edenshaw (film)
 Guy Édoin (film)
 Martin Edralin (film)
 Atom Egoyan (film)
 Kris Elgstrand (film)
 Anne Émond (film)
 Bernard Émond (film)
 Danishka Esterhazy (film)
 Jesse Ewles (film)

F 
 Philippe Falardeau (film)
 Leonard Farlinger (film)
 Hossein Martin Fazeli
 Donna Feore (theatre)
 Lynne Fernie (documentary)
 Lee Filipovski (film)
 Thom Fitzgerald (film)
 Ann Marie Fleming (film)
 Peter Foldy (film)
 Sarah Fortin (film)
 Tori Foster (documentary)
 Martin Fournier (documentary)
 Yves Christian Fournier
 Graham Foy (film, music video; a/k/a Fantavious Fritz)
 Alexandre Franchi (film)
 Max Fraser (film)
 James Freer (film)
 Camelia Frieberg (film)
 William Fruet (film, theatre)
 Kevan Funk (film, music video)
 Kelly Fyffe-Marshall (film)

G 
 Simon Galiero (film)
 Lorena Gale (theatre)
 Pierre Gang (film, television)
 Sean Garrity (film)
 Connor Gaston (film)
 Patrick Gazé (film)
 Fran Gebhard (theatre)
 Serge Giguère (documentary)
 Malca Gillson (documentary)
 Simon Gionet (film)
 Jacques Giraldeau (documentary)
 Maxime Giroux (film)
 Yan Giroux (film)
 Grace Glowicki (film)
 Noam Gonick (film)
 Danis Goulet (film)
 Sophie Goyette (film)
 Ivan Grbovic (film)
 Anais Granofsky (film, television)
 Cynthia Grant (theatre)
 Philippe Grégoire (film)
 John Greyson (film)
 Daniel Grou (film)
 Paul Gury (film, theatre)

H 
 Brigitte Haentjens (theatre)
 Paul Haggis (film)
 Arthur Hammond (documentary)
 Rick Hancox (film)
 Bretten Hannam (film)
 Matthew Hannam (film)
 Reginald Harkema (film)
 Ian Harnarine (film)
 Alicia K. Harris (film)
 John Kent Harrison (television)
 Mary Harron (film)
 Bobbi Jo Hart (documentary)
 Kenneth J. Harvey (film)
 Jeremiah Hayes (documentary film and television)
 Karl R. Hearne (film)
 Titus Heckel (film)
 Kathleen Hepburn (film)
 David Hewlett (film)
 Federico Hidalgo (film)
 Olivier Higgins (documentary)
 Arthur Hiller (film)
 Mars Horodyski (film, television)
 Emanuel Hoss-Desmarais (film)
 Pierre Houle (film, television)
 John Howe (documentary)
 Tiffany Hsiung (documentary
 Rémy Huberdeau (film)
 Andrew Huculiak (film)
 Andrew Hull

I 
 Madeline Ivalu (film)

J 
 Douglas Jackson
 Michael Jacot
 Tanja Jacobs (theatre)
 François Jaros (film, television)
 Kathleen Jayme (documentary)
 Katherine Jerkovic (film)
 Slater Jewell-Kemker (film)
 Norman Jewison (film)
 Renuka Jeyapalan (film, television)
 Brian D. Johnson (documentary)
 Evan Johnson (film)
 Galen Johnson (film)
 Matt Johnson (film, television)
 Stephanie Joline (film, television)
 Adam Garnet Jones (film)
 Ronalda Jones (theatre)
 Meryam Joobeur (film)
 Aida Jordão (theatre)
 Chase Joynt (documentary)
 Marie-Ève Juste (film)

K 
 Jamie Kastner (film)
 John Kastner (film)
 Jillian Keiley (theatre)
 Olivier Kemeid (theatre)
 Elza Kephart (film)
 Sami Khan (film)
 Gloria Ui Young Kim (film, television)
 Allan King (film, television)
 Albert Kish (documentary)
 Bonnie Sherr Klein (film)
 Joey Klein (film)
 Julien Knafo (film)
 Larysa Kondracki (film)
 Ted Kotcheff (film, television)
 Anthony Kramreither 
 Roman Kroitor (documentary)
 Zacharias Kunuk (film)
 Julia Kwan (film)
 Ky Nam Le Duc (film)

L 
 Bruce LaBruce (film)
 Stéphane Lafleur (film)
 Ian Lagarde (film)
 Patrice Laliberté (film, television)
 Jeremy Lalonde (film)
 Michel Langlois (film)
 Stéphane Lapointe (film)
 Martin Laroche (film)
 Hugo Latulippe (documentary)
 Pier-Luc Latulippe (documentary)
 Jean-Claude Lauzon (film)
 Simon Lavoie (film)
 Elizabeth Lazebnik (film)
 Walter Learning
 Jeanne Leblanc (film)
 John L'Ecuyer (film, television)
 Gerald L'Ecuyer (film, television)
 Shawn Levy (film, television)
 Marc-Antoine Lemire (film)
 Marquise Lepage (film)
 Robert Lepage (film, theatre)
 Chloé Leriche (film)
 Jean-François Lesage (documentary)
 Philippe Lesage (film)
 Chandler Levack (film, music video)
 Richard J. Lewis
 Yonah Lewis
 Desiree Lim
 Drew Lint (film)
 Arthur Lipsett (experimental)
 Jason Loftus (documentary)
 Ariane Louis-Seize (film)
 Colin Low (documentary)
 Kate Lushington (theatre)
 Kate Lynch
 Peter Lynch
 Laurie Lynd (film, television)

M 
 Johnny Ma (film)
 Michael Mabbott (film, television)
 Guy Maddin (film)
 Adam MacDonald
 Shane MacDougall
 Adriana Maggs (film, television)
 Michèle Magny (theatre)
 Gilles Maheu (theatre)
 Jonah Malak (documentary)
 Émilie Mannering (film)
 Leon Marr (film, television)
 Catherine Martin (film)
 Asghar Massombagi (film)
 Yasmine Mathurin (film)
 Gail Maurice (film)
 Blake Mawson (film)
 Jackie Maxwell (theatre)
 Bruce McDonald (film, television)
 Molly McGlynn (film, television)
 Don McKellar (film, television)
 Ryan McKenna (film)
 Norman McLaren (film)
 Chelsea McMullan (film)
 Stella Meghie
 Deepa Mehta (film)
 Dilip Mehta
 Richie Mehta (film)
 André Melançon (film, television)
 Robert Ménard (film)
 Constant Mentzas (film)
 Amy Miller (film)
 Jacquelyn Mills (documentary)
 Pat Mills (film)
 Michelle Mohabeer (film)
 Andrew Moir (documentary)
 Grayson Moore (film)
 Faran Moradi (film, television)
 Michel Moreau (documentary)
 Robert Morin (film)
 Wendy Morgan (film, television, music video)
 Nathan Morlando (film)
 James Motluk (film, television)
 Jasmin Mozaffari (film)
 Grant Munro (animation, documentary)
 Janet Munsil (theatre)

N 
 Kaveh Nabatian (film, music video)
 Ruba Nadda (film)
 Shasha Nakhai (film)
 Darlene Naponse (film)
 Ariel Nasr (documentary)
 Vincenzo Natali (film)
 Sergio Navarretta (film)
 Aubrey Nealon (film, television)
 Kim Nguyen (film)
 Diane Nyland Proctor (theatre)

O 
 Alanis Obomsawin (documentary)
 Diane Obomsawin (animation)
 Hugh O'Connor (documentary)
 Terrance Odette (film, television)
 Charles Officer (film)
 Linda Ohama (film)
 Randall Okita (film)
 Sidney Olcott
 Taylor Olson (film)
 Rafaël Ouellet (film)
 Don Owen (documentary, film)

P 
 Indrani Pal-Chaudhuri (film, TV)
 Alisa Palmer (theatre)
 John Palmer (film, theatre)
 Kire Paputts (film)
 Ajay Patel (Product)
 Sanjay Patel
 Steve Patry (documentary)
 Zoé Pelchat (film)
 Gabriel Pelletier (film, television)
 Nadine Pequeneza (documentary)
 Nicolás Pereda (film)
 Arturo Pérez Torres
 Carmine Pierre-Dufour (film)
 Ileana Pietrobruno
 Benoît Pilon
 Sébastien Pilote (film)
Noah Pink
 Pedro Pires
 Bruce Pittman (film)
 Pascal Plante (film)
 Maurice Podbrey (theatre)
 Jeremy Podeswa (film, TV)
 Sarah Polley (film)
 Léa Pool (film)
 Gerald Potterton (animation, film)
 Paul David Power (theatre)
 Michel Poulette (film, TV)
 Brigitte Poupart (film)
 Jason Priestley
 Ben Proudfoot (documentary film)
 Alex Pugsley (film)

R 
 Jared Raab (film, television, music video)
 Tom Radford (documentary film and television)
 Matthew Rankin (film)
 Mort Ransen (film)
 Benjamin Ratner (film)
 Ryan Redford (film)
 Samir Rehem (film, television)
 Kim Renders (theatre)
 Ivan Reitman (film)
 Jason Reitman (film)
 Boyce Richardson (documentary)
 Kyle Rideout (film)
 Velcrow Ripper (documentary film)
 Diane Roberts (theatre)
 Bill Robertson (film)
 Daniel Roby (film)
 Lina Rodriguez (film)
 Daniel Roher (documentary)
 Sophy Romvari (film)
 Les Rose (film, television)
 Sébastien Rose (film)
 Patricia Rozema (film)
 Baņuta Rubess (theatre)
 Lisa Rubin (theatre)

S 
 Jeffrey St. Jules (film)
 Annie St-Pierre (film)
 Brigitte Sauriol (film)
 Mark Sawers (film, television)
 Jeremy Schaulin-Rioux (film, music video)
 David Secter (film)
 Mack Sennett (film)
 Paul Shapiro (film, television)
 Kathryn Shaw (theatre)
 Bashar Shbib (film)
 Donald Shebib (film)
 Domee Shi (film)
 Anthony Shim (film)
 Albert Shin (film)
 Paul Shkordoff (film)
 Albert Shin (film, television)
 Aidan Shipley (film)
 Mina Shum (film)
 Harbinder Singh (television)
 Anne-Marie Sirois (film)
 Lenin M. Sivam
 Dylan Akio Smith (film)
 Scott Smith (film)
 Adam Smoluk
 Jonathan Sobol (film)
 Frances-Anne Solomon (film)
 Warren P. Sonoda (film, television)
 Roger Spottiswoode (film, television)
 John Spotton (documentary)
 Lib Spry (theatre)
 Robin Spry (documentary, film)
 John Stark (film, theatre)
 Chris Di Staulo
 Lynne Stopkewich (film, television)
 Sudz Sutherland (film, television)
 Michèle Stephenson (film)
 Ginny Stikeman
 Matthew Swanson (film)
 Bruce Sweeney (film)

T 
 Elle-Máijá Tailfeathers (film)
 Katie Tallo (film, television)
 Jonathan Tammuz
 Paul Tana (film)
 Jordan Tannahill (film, theatre)
 Amanda Tapping (television)
 Emmanuel Tardif (film)
 Éric Tessier (film, television)
 Calvin Thomas (film)
 Madison Thomas (film)
 Paul Thompson
 Kelly Thornton (theatre)
 Vincent Toi (film)
 Thyrone Tommy (film)
 Aren X. Tulchinsky
 Marie-Hélène Turcotte (film)
 André Turpin (film)
 Terry Tweed (theatre)
 Charlie Tyrell (film, music video)

U 
 Natar Ungalaaq (film)
 Allan Ungar

V 
 Esther Valiquette (documentary)
 Jean-Marc Vallée (film)
 John Varszegi (film, theatre)
 Ingrid Veninger (film)
 Rhayne Vermette (film)
 Robert Verrall (documentary)
 Myriam Verreault (film)
 Denis Villeneuve (film)
 Martin Villeneuve (film)
 Salomé Villeneuve (film)
 Mary Vingoe (theatre)
 Clement Virgo (film)
 Wiebke von Carolsfeld (film)

W 
 Kristina Wagenbauer (film)
 John Walker (documentary)
 Cole Walliser (commercial, music video)
 Wayne Wapeemukwa (film)
 Darrell Wasyk (film)
 Jeth Weinrich (music video, documentary)
 Aerlyn Weissman (documentary)
 David Wellington (film)
 Peter Wellington (film)
 Ron Weyman (documentary, television)
 Anne Wheeler (film)
 Maureen White (theatre)
 Sherry White (film, television)
 Nigel Shawn Williams (theatre)
 Rich Williamson (film)
 Joyce Wieland (film)
 Joyce Wong (film, television)

Y 
 Gary Yates
 Michael Yerxa (documentary)
 Aleysa Young (television)

Z 
 John Zaritsky (documentary)
 Aziz Zoromba (film)
 Svetlana Zylin (theatre)

See also 

 List of Canadian actors
 List of Canadian writers
 List of Canadian comedians
 List of Canadian musicians
 List of Canadian artists

Directors
Canada
Theatre-related lists
 Directors